Bibhu Bhattacharya (17 September 1944 – 22 September 2011) was a Bengali Indian male actor of TV and films. He was born in Jharia, Bihar, British India (now Jharia, Jharkhand, India). He gained prominence and became a household name only in 1998 as Jatayu (Lalmohan Ganguly) in Sandip Ray’s Feluda, based on stories by his late father, maestro Satyajit Ray. In 2011, he died of Cardiac arrest in Howrah, West Bengal.

Acting career
Bibhu Bhattacharya never attended any school. He was acting in studios, when other boys of his age were studying. At the age of four-and-a-half he started acting in a film called Maryada, starring Uttam Kumar.

He was called Master Bibhu, one of the most prominent child actors in Bengali films and very popular with actors like Jahar Ganguly and Chhabi Biswas. He played the title role in the movie Prahlad (1952) and did movies like Bindur Chhele (1952), Dhruba (1953), Rani Rashmoni (1955) and Dui Bon (1955). After he grew up and became a teenager, he could no longer be a child actor and offers began to dry up. His last film as a child actor was Sagar Sangame (1959). Then, he didn’t get another film for almost 38 years. In between, he kept himself busy with theater and TV serials.

Feluda series
It was only in 1998 that he got the dream role of Jatayu. His first film as Jatayu was Jahangirer Shornomudra (1999) and he also acted as Jatayu in Bombaiyer Bombete (2003), Kailashey Kelenkari (2007), Tintorettor Jishu (2007), Gorosthaney Sabdhan (2010) and Royal Bengal Rahasya (2011). He was legendary in his performance and managed to capture in essence the spirit of the character so well that even Sandip Ray, the director, found him perfect as a replacement. He had completed dubbing for the Feluda film Royal Bengal Rahasya the day before he died. Initially, it was difficult to replace the legendary actor, Santosh Dutta as Jatayu, but he became popular with time.

Filmography
Macho Mustanaa (2012)
Bhooter Bhabishyat (2012)
Aalo Chhaya (2012)
Royal Bengal Rahasya (Feluda theatrical film) (2011) as Jatayu (Lalmohan Ganguly)
Tenida (2011)
Gorosthaney Sabdhan (Feluda theatrical film) (2010) as Jatayu (Lalmohan Ganguly)
Bela Sheshe (2009)
Mallick Bari (2009)
Swartha (2009)
Tintorettor Jishu (Feluda theatrical film) (2008) as Jatayu (Lalmohan Ganguly)
Abelay Garam Bhaat (2008)
Kailashey Kelenkari (Feluda theatrical film) (2007) as Jatayu (Lalmohan Ganguly)
Bombaiyer Bombete (Feluda theatrical film) (2003) as Jatayu (Lalmohan Ganguly)
Satyajiter Priyo Golpo (Dr Munshir Diary For ETV Bangla) (Feluda TV film) (2000) as Jatayu (Lalmohan Ganguly)
Satyajiter Goppo (Jahangirer Swarnamudra, Ghurghutiyar Ghotona, Golapi Mukto Rahashya, Ambar Sen Antardhan Rahashya for DD Bangla) (Feluda TV films) (1999) as Jatayu (Lalmohan Ganguly)
Sagar Sangamey (1959)
Swapnapuri (1959)
Thakur Haridas (1959)
Purir Mandir (1958)
Sree Sree Maa (1958)
Harishchandra (1957)
Janmatithi (1957)
Khela Bhangar Khela (1957)
Omkarer Joyjatra (1957)
Mamlar Phal (1956)
Putrabadhu (1956)
Bir Hambir (1955)
Dui Bon (1955)
Jharer Pare (1955)
Prashna (1955)
Rani Rasmani (1955)
Srikrishna Sudama (1955)
Agnipariksha (1954)
Bakul (1954)
Ladies Seat (1954)
Nababidhan (1954)
Prafulla (1954)
Dhruba (1953)
Sitar Patal Prabesh (1953)
Aandhi (1952)
Bindur Chhele (1952)
Bishwamitra (1952)
Nildarpan (1952)
Pallisamaj (1952)
Prahlad (1952)
Sahasa (1952)
Bhakta Raghunath (1951)
Kulhara (1951)
Pratyabartan (1951)
Maryada (1950)

Feluda Series TV films

Jahangirer Swarnamudra (1998)
Ambar Sen Antordhan Rahashya (1998)
Golapi Mukta Rahashaya (1998)
Dr. Munshir Diary (2000)

See also
 Satyajit Ray
 Literary works of Satyajit Ray
 Sandip Ray
 Santosh Dutta
 Feluda
 Jatayu (Lalmohan Ganguly)
 Feluda in film
 Professor Shonku
 Tarini khuro
 Tarini Khuro in other media
 Culture of Bengal
 Culture of West Bengal

References

External links

My Fundays Telegraph Kolkata article 24 December 2008

Indian male film actors
Male actors from Kolkata
Bengali male actors
Male actors in Bengali cinema
2011 deaths
1944 births
20th-century Indian male actors
21st-century Indian male actors
Bengali male television actors
Indian male television actors
People from Howrah